Mount Southard is a lone mountain (2,400 m) standing 5 nautical miles (9 km) northwest of Welcome Mountain in the northwest extremity of the Outback Nunataks. Mapped by United States Geological Survey (USGS) from surveys and U.S. Navy air photos, 1959–64. Named by Advisory Committee on Antarctic Names (US-ACAN) for Rupert B. Southard, Chief, Office of International Activities, USGS, with responsibility for USGS field parties working in Antarctica; later Chief of the Topographic Division of USGS.

Mountains of Oates Land